The list of Olympic men's ice hockey players for Finland consisted of 203 skaters and 22 goaltenders. Men's ice hockey tournaments have been staged at the Olympic Games since 1920 (it was introduced at the 1920 Summer Olympics, and was permanently added to the Winter Olympic Games in 1924). Finland has participated in seventeen tournaments, the first in 1952 and the most recent in 2018. Finland has won six medals: two silver and four bronze, with the most recent medal being a bronze in 2014.

Teemu Selänne has scored the most goals, with 24, and has the most points, 43 while Saku Koivu have has the most assists, with 21. Selänne and Raimo Helminen have competed in the most Olympics, having taken part in six tournaments, while Helminen has played the most games of any skater, with 39.

Two players, Jari Kurri and Teemu Selänne, have been inducted into the Hockey Hall of Fame, while 17 players have been inducted into the International Ice Hockey Federation Hall of Fame, though Kalevi Numminen was inducted as a builder and Unto Wiitala as a referee.



Key

Goaltenders

Skaters

References

Notes

Citations

References

 
 
 
 
 
 

Ice hockey
Finland
Finland